Events in the year 1987 in Greece.

Incumbents
President – Christos Sartzetakis
Prime Minister of Greece – Andreas Papandreou

References

 
Years of the 20th century in Greece
Greece
1980s in Greece
Greece